Duchaylard Island is an island  long at the west side of Grandidier Channel, lying  southeast of Vieugue Island and  west of Cape Garcia, off the west coast of Graham Land. It was discovered by the French Antarctic Expedition, 1903–05, and named by Jean-Baptiste Charcot for Monsieur du Chaylard, French Minister Plenipotentiary at Montevideo, Uruguay. The recommended spelling follows the form used in Maurice Bongrain's report of 1914 and is now firmly established.

See also 
 List of Antarctic and sub-Antarctic islands

References 

Islands of Graham Land
Graham Coast